Dhaka-10 is a constituency represented in the Jatiya Sangsad (National Parliament) of Bangladesh since 2020 by Sheikh Fazle Noor Taposh  

Dhaka-10 is a constituency represented in the Jatiya Sangsad (National Parliament) of Bangladesh since 2020 by Shafiul Islam Mohiuddin of the Awami League.

Boundaries 
The constituency encompasses Dhaka South City Corporation wards 14 through 18, and 22.

History 
The constituency was created for the first general elections in newly independent Bangladesh, held in 1973.

Ahead of the 2008 general election, the Election Commission redrew constituency boundaries to reflect population changes revealed by the 2001 Bangladesh census. The 2008 redistricting altered the boundaries of the constituency.

Members of Parliament

Elections

Elections in the 2010s 
Sheikh Fazle Noor Taposh was elected unopposed in the 2014 general election after opposition parties withdrew their candidacies in a boycott of the election.

Elections in the 2000s 

Abdul Mannan resigned from parliament in March 2004 to join a new political party, Bikalpa Dhara Bangladesh. Mannan's resignation triggered a July 2004 by-election, in which Mohammad Mosaddak Ali of the BNP was elected.

Elections in the 1990s

References

External links
 

Parliamentary constituencies in Bangladesh
Dhaka District